A tensor muscle has the function of tensing (stretching or tightening) a part and
may refer to:

 Tensor fasciae latae muscle
 Tensor tympani muscle
 Tensor vastus intermedius muscle
 Tensor veli palatini muscle